Boswell Bennie Williams  (May 16, 1926 – July 20, 2014) was a Saint Lucian politician who represented the district of Vieux Fort in the legislature from 1974 to 1979.

He was appointed by Queen Elizabeth II of Saint Lucia as governor-general on June 19, 1980, replacing Sir Allen Montgomery Lewis, father of the former prime minister Vaughan Lewis. He was initially acting governor general, becoming governor general in December 1981. Williams had to confront the most serious constitutional crisis in the history of Saint Lucia soon after the rejection of Prime Minister Allan Louisy's budget proposal. He was removed from office by the Queen on the advice of Louisy with effect from December 12, 1982.

Williams died at his home in Sans Soucis on July 20, 2014 at the age of 88.

See also
 History of Saint Lucia

References

External links 
 
 Governors General of Saint Lucia
 Civics

1926 births
2014 deaths
Governors-General of Saint Lucia
Members of the House of Assembly of Saint Lucia
Grand Cross of the Order of Saint Lucia
People from Vieux Fort, Saint Lucia